Sharif Kunjahi ( (Shahmukhi)) (1914 – 2007) was a leading writer and poet of Punjabi. He was among the first faculty members of the Department of Punjabi Language at University of Punjab in the 1970s and contributed to Punjabi literature as a poet, prose writer, teacher, research scholar, linguist, lexicographer and translator.

Early life and education 
Sharif was born on 13 May 1914 in Kunjah, a small town of Gujrat District in Punjab. His father was a school teacher. Shareef completed his matriculation in 1930 from a school in Kunjah and higher secondary in 1933 from Government Intermediate College, Jehlum. By that time he had started writing poetry and was known as a progressive writer sympathetic to the Indian National Congress. This affiliation became a hindrance for him to get police clearance for entry level jobs in the government service.

In 1943, he completed his Munshi Fazal and BA from Punjab University as a private student and later completed teacher's training from Lahore. He then continued teaching at various schools until he obtained the degree of MA Urdu in 1954, and of MA Persian in 1956. In 1959, he was hired as lecturer in Persian language at Government College, Campbellpur (now called Attock), Pakistan. He was transferred to Government College Jhelum from where he retired in 1973. From 1973 to 1980, he taught at the newly established Punjabi Department at the University of the Punjab, Lahore.

Death
He died on 20 January 2007 and was interred in the compound of Ghanimat Kunjahi's mazar in Kunjah, Gujrat District, Pakistan.

Contributions to Punjabi literature

Poetry 
Although Sharif wrote poetry in both Urdu and Persian languages, and even made a name as an Urdu poet quite early in his writing career, Punjabi was always his first love. For an up-and-coming Muslim writer of that period, especially among the early progressive writers and poets, adopting Punjabi for his creative articulation was a rare phenomenon.

He became among the pioneers of modern Punjabi poetry from the 1930s at about the same time when Prof Mohan Singh introduced secular themes and a new style in Punjabi poetry. His first collection of Punjabi poetry Jagraate (sleepless nights) was first published in Gurmukhi in East Punjab in 1958, and wasn't published in Shahmukhi in West Punjab until 1965. It contained only 37 poems. His second anthology Orak Hondi Lou (dimming light) was published in 1995.

Kunjahi's poetry is a complete break from the qissa and Sufi traditions. Even his earliest poems have all the elements of modern poetry: secularism, expression of individualist experience, awareness of social and political changes around him. His deep sense of departure from the existing value system was expressed in many of his early poems:
Today, I am going to walk past your village,
A place from where I was not able to move away in the past,
Where I always was looking for some excuse to go.
What excuse? The truth is that you were the real reason
Who had made that village a place for pilgrimage?
What a beautiful name it had,
How exciting it was to just listen to its name.
Looking at its trees from a distance would take away all tiredness,
It seemed like their branches were giving me a signal to come close.
Standing under their shadow was heavenly.
Today, I will walk by those trees.
Nothing is pulling me towards them,
Neither do I feel the loving touch of breeze coming from your village
No one is there to meet me with affection
Or waiting for me,
Hiding behind the Kikkar trees, and alone
I am passing by your village
As if it is a graveyard, not a village.
(Translation from Jagraate)

Without being overburdened by excessive symbolism or extreme emotions, Kunjahi's poetry is a realistic and balanced expression of his social consciousness in a relatively simple and straightforward manner. He played a crucial role in setting new directions for Punjabi poetry and he opened doors for Punjabi poets to move away from the traditional style of writing poetry and experiment with new modes and techniques.

Prose 
Just like he had done in poetry, Sharif Kunjahi also broke new grounds in Punjabi prose. It was through his translations in Punjabi of two books of Bertrand Russell and Allama Iqbal’s lectures — ‘Reconstruction of Religious Thoughts’ — among the numerous other translations, that he demonstrated that Punjabi language is capable of eloquently communicating even the most complex philosophical thoughts. He developed many new terms by creatively employing the vast treasure of Punjabi vocabulary. Perhaps his masterpiece is his translation of the Qur'an in idiomatic and fluent Punjabi of such a high order that it has set a new standard for writing Punjabi prose. This Punjabi translation was published in 1997 by Punjabi foundation 25 c Lower Mall Lahore. Al-Quran ul Karim (Arabic-Punjabi) Sharif Kunjahi is available in UMT Lahore code is 61158 and 297-12259142 ALQ v-2. In Quaid-e-Azam Library Lahore both Volume of Sharif Kunjahi Punjabi Translations are available Library code is 237.45 498 ج 2،ج1 ش  On internet this translation in Punjabi Shahmukhi is available on Website http://apnaorg.com/quran/page1.htm

A new Punjabi Shahmukhi Translation has been published by Daurulislam Publisher. this Translation has been done by Professor Roshan Khan Kakar and Assisted by his Dr Arif Mehmood and Qari Tariq Javaid Arfi. The link to his Punjabi translation is 

He was among the earliest writers who employed modern techniques of literary criticism. In a different field, his research in identifying many linguistic similarities in the Punjabi and Scandinavian languages is another pioneering piece of work.

Through his lifelong work on various aspects of Punjabi literature and language, Sharif Kunjahi carried the burden of serving his language during a time when most Muslim Punjabis had rejected their own language for all literary and creative expression. Sharif Kunjahi enriched the Punjabi language in so many different ways that his contributions will always be remembered in the history of Punjabi literature.

Translator
Shareef Kunjahi also translated the Quran in fluent Punjabi language.

Awards and recognition
 Pride of Performance Award by the President of Pakistan in 2000.
 Tamgha-i-Imtiaz (Medal of Excellence) Award by the Government of Pakistan in 1983
 A tribute was paid to Shareef Kunjahi at a Pakistan Academy of Letters event by his fellow writers.
 Lifetime Achievement Award by the World Punjabi Congress
 Nishan-i-Gujrat Award by the Literary Award Council of Gujrat in 1980

References

External links 
 Sharif Kunjahi's book Jhatiaan
 Sharif Kunjahi's book Jagratay (verse)
  Sharif Kunjahi's discounted book

1914 births
2007 deaths
Punjabi academics
Punjabi people
Punjabi-language poets
People from Gujrat District
Pakistani scholars
Linguists from Pakistan
Pakistani translators
Pakistani literary critics
20th-century Pakistani poets
Pakistani lexicographers
University of the Punjab alumni
20th-century translators
20th-century linguists
20th-century lexicographers
Recipients of Tamgha-e-Imtiaz
Recipients of the Pride of Performance